Below are the results of the first season of the Asia Pacific Poker Tour.  All currencies are US dollars unless otherwise noted.

Events

APPT Manila 
 Casino: Hyatt Hotel & Casino Manila 
 Buy-in: $2,500
 3-Day Event: Friday, August 24, 2007 to Sunday, August 26, 2007
 Number of buy-ins: 255
 Total Prize Pool: $599,250
 Number of Payouts: 24
 Winning Hand:

APPT Seoul 
 Casino: Paradise Walker-Hill Casino 
 Buy-in: $2,500 + $200
 2-Day Event: Saturday, September 29, 2007 to Sunday, September 30, 2007
 Number of buy-ins: 186
 Total Prize Pool: $437,100
 Number of Payouts: 16
 Winning Hand:

APPT Macau 
 Casino: Grand Waldo Hotel & Casino 
 Buy-in: $2,500
 6-Day Event: Thursday, September 22, 2007 to Tuesday, September 27, 2007
 Number of buy-ins: 352
 Total Prize Pool: $809,600
 Number of Payouts: 40
 Winning Hand:

APPT Sydney 
 Casino: Star City Casino 
 Buy-in: A$6,300
 4-Day Event: Thursday, December 13, 2007 to Sunday, December 16, 2007
 Number of buy-ins: 561
 Total Prize Pool: A$3,366,000 (US$2,580,286)
 Number of Payouts: 56
 Winning Hand:

Notes

External links
Official site

Asia Pacific Poker Tour
2007 in poker